is a professional Japanese baseball player. He is a pitcher for the Hiroshima Toyo Carp of Nippon Professional Baseball (NPB).

References 

2001 births
Living people
Baseball people from Fukui Prefecture
Nippon Professional Baseball pitchers
Hiroshima Toyo Carp players
People from Echizen, Fukui